Agroterini is a tribe of the species-rich subfamily Spilomelinae in the pyraloid moth family Crambidae. The tribe was erected by Alexandre Noël Charles Acloque in 1897.

Genera
Agroterini currently contains 30 genera, altogether comprising 433 species:
Aetholix Lederer, 1863
Agrotera Schrank, 1802 (= Agroptera Hampson, 1899)
Aiyura Munroe, 1974
Bocchoropsis Amsel, 1956
Chalcidoptera Butler, 1887 (= Chaleidoptera Carus, 1888, Euthalantha Snellen, 1895)
Chilochromopsis Munroe, 1964
Coenostolopsis Munroe, 1960
Diastictis Hübner, 1818 (= Anomostictis Warren, 1892, Diastichtis Forbes, 1923)
Framinghamia Strand, 1920
Glaucobotys Maes, 2008
Goliathodes Munroe, 1974
Gypodes Munroe, 1976
Haritalodes Warren, 1890
Lygropia Lederer, 1863 (= Hyperthalia Warren, 1896)
Lypotigris Hübner, 1825
Micromartinia Amsel, 1957 (= Martinia Amsel, 1956)
Microthyris Lederer, 1863 (= Crossophora Möschler, 1890, Cyclocena Möschler, 1890, Grossophora Munroe, 1956)
Nagiella Munroe, 1976
Neoanalthes Yamanaka & Kirpichnikova, 1993
Nosophora Lederer, 1863 (= Analthes Lederer, 1863, Analtes Lederer, 1863, Eidama Walker, 1866)
Notarcha Meyrick, 1884 (= Haritala Moore, 1886)
Pantographa Lederer, 1863 (= Pantographis Lederer, 1863, Pantograpta Hampson, 1899)
Paranacoleia Inoue, 1982
Patania Moore, 1888 (= Loxoscia Warren, 1890, Nagia Walker, 1866, Pleuroptya Meyrick, 1890)
Phaedropsis Warren, 1890 (= Trichognathos Amsel, 1956, Trichognathus Edwards & Vevers, 1975)
Phostria Hübner, 1819 (= Antennodes Swinhoe, 1906, Condega Moore, 1886, Hoplisa Snellen, 1899, Oedematarcha Swinhoe, 1900, Parbokla Swinhoe, 1900, Plectrona Snellen, 1895, Plectroctena Snellen, 1881, Saroscelis Meyrick, 1894, Vatica Walker, 1869)
Phryganodes Guenée, 1854 (= Phyganodes Dognin, 1907)
Suhela Singh, Ranjan, Kirti & Chandra, 2022
Tetracona Meyrick, 1884
Ulopeza Zeller, 1852 (= Pseudanalthes Warren, 1890, Pseudanaltes Hampson, 1898, Xacca Walker, 1869, Xasca Neave, 1940)

References

Spilomelinae
Moth tribes